Lithium arsenide is a binary inorganic compound of lithium and arsenic with the chemical formula .

Synthesis
Heating stoichiometric amounts of arsenic and lithium in an inert atmosphere:
 Li + As → LiAs

Phsysical properties
Lithium arsenide forms monoclinic crystals, space group P21/c, cell parameters a = 0.579 nm, b = 0.524 nm, c = 1.070 nm, β = 117.4°, Z = 8.

References

Arsenides
Lithium compounds